The 2006 Pittsburgh Panthers football team represented the University of Pittsburgh in the 2006 NCAA Division I FBS football season.

Schedule

Coaching staff

Team players drafted into the NFL

References

Pittsburgh
Pittsburgh Panthers football seasons
Pittsburgh Panthers football